David B. Samadi is an American urologist, a Newsmax contributor, and the former Chairman of Urology and Chief of Robotic Surgery at Lenox Hill Hospital.

Biography
Born and raised in the Persian Jewish community of Iran, at age 15 Samadi and his younger brother left in 1979 after the Iranian Revolution. They continued their education in Belgium and the UK before coming to the United States where Samadi completed high school in Roslyn, New York. He attended Stony Brook University and earned his degree in biochemistry. He earned his M.D from S.U.N.Y., Stony Brook School of Medicine, Stony Brook, New York in 1994, and completed his postgraduate training in urology at Montefiore Medical Center and in urology at Albert Einstein College of Medicine in 1996 and Montefiore Medical Center in 2000. He completed an oncology fellowship in urology at Memorial Sloan Kettering Cancer Center in 2001 and a robotic radical prostatectomy fellowship at Henri Mondor Hospital Creteil in France under the mentorship of Professor Claude Abbou in 2002.

Career
He first practiced at Columbia Presbyterian Hospital, then joined the faculty of Mt. Sinai School of Medicine in 2007 where he became the Vice Chair of the Department of Urology, and the Chief of Robotics and Minimally Invasive Surgery. In 2012, he was the highest paid doctor in New York City, earning $7.6 million.

He invented the Samadi Modified Advanced Robotic Treatment for prostate cancer surgeries. The technique was designed to replace open surgery with a minimally invasive alternative using the da Vinci Surgical System.

In November 2019, Lenox Hill agreed to pay $12.3 million to settle a Medicare fraud lawsuit brought because Samadi performed multiple surgeries at the same time, leaving patients unsupervised by a urologist when he left one operating room for another; billing for unnecessary procedures; and inadequately supervised residents. The suit was the result of an investigation by the United States Attorney for the Southern District of New York, Geoffrey Berman, who characterized the approach as "assembly line medicine" in violation of Medicare and hospital regulations.

Patients were distressed to learn that Samadi was not actually performing their surgical procedures and was often not in the operating room, according to a Boston Globe investigation.

In June 2020, He joined conservative news outlet Newsmax as a medical contributor.

He is currently director of men's health at St. Francis Hospital in Roslyn, NY.

References

External links
 

Computer-assisted surgery
American surgeons
Living people
Iranian Jews
American people of Iranian-Jewish descent
20th-century Mizrahi Jews
21st-century Mizrahi Jews
Iranian emigrants to the United States
American roboticists
Year of birth missing (living people)
Fox News people
People from Old Westbury, New York
People from Roslyn, New York
Celebrity doctors
Iranian expatriate academics
Academics of Iranian descent
Scientists from New York (state)
Roslyn High School alumni